Lía Bermúdez  (August 4, 1930 – October 22, 2021) was a Venezuelan sculptor.

Bermúdez was born in Caracas. She began her studies at the School of Applied Arts in Caracas (1944–1946) and moved to Maracaibo. There in 1947, she continued her studies at the Escuela de Bellas Artes. She was a student of the masters Francisco Narváez and Julio Maragall.

Major exhibitions: Centro de Bellas Artes, Maracaibo, Zulia State, 1957, Ateneo de Valencia, Carabobo State, 1966, Gallery of Visual Arts, University of Zulia, Maracaibo, Museum of Modern Art of Latin America, Washington, DC, 1979, Museo de Arte Contemporáneo de Caracas, 1989. In 1992, this museum presented a retrospective of her work.

She was awarded the Order of the Liberator Knighthood, an award from the University of Carabobo, Zulia Governor's Award, Order of Maracaibo City in the first class, Order of Francisco de Miranda, Ana Maria Campos decoration and the National Prize of Plastic Arts of Venezuela 2006 amongst others.

References
This article was initially translated from the Spanish Wikipedia.

External links

 Lia Bermudez foundation

Artists from Caracas
20th-century Venezuelan sculptors
1930 births
2021 deaths
Venezuelan women sculptors
20th-century women artists
21st-century sculptors
21st-century women artists
20th-century Venezuelan women
21st-century Venezuelan women